Coconut Oil is the debut solo EP by American singer and rapper Lizzo. It was released on October 7, 2016 by Nice Life Recording Company and Atlantic Records, Lizzo's first major-label release. Lizzo co-wrote each song on the album, while enlisting Ricky Reed, Christian Rich, Dubbel Dutch, and Jesse Shatkin for the album's production. The result was a departure from Lizzo's previous hip hop releases. Lyrically, the extended play explores themes of body positivity, self-love, and the journey to those ideals. Coconut Oil received positive reviews from music critics.

Commercially, Coconut Oil initially peaked at number 44 on the Billboard Top R&B/Hip-Hop Albums chart, making it Lizzo's first release to chart. However, two years after it was first released, the popularity of the single "Good as Hell" renewed interest in the EP and it subsequently reached a new peak of number 31 on the Billboard Top 200 Albums 
chart.

To promote the extended play, Lizzo embarked on the Good as Hell Tour in 2017. "Good as Hell" was released as the EP's first single, as part of the soundtrack for the 2016 film Barbershop: The Next Cut. "Phone" was released shortly after the announcement of the extended play as the second single. "Scuse Me" was released as the third and final single in early 2017, and was accompanied with a music video. Lizzo's song "Worship" was featured in the first episode of Step Up: High Water.

Background
Coconut Oil is Lizzo's first release with a major record label, and was originally intended as a full-length release. The EP serves as the follow up to the singer's second studio album, Big Grrrl Small World (2015). Lizzo described the reason for the name Coconut Oil, stating:

Composition
The EP discusses themes of body positivity, self-love, and the trials one faces to achieve those ideals. The opening track, "Worship", contains mambo-inspired horns and a showtune-like chorus, creating two very different syncopated dance rhythms. “Phone” has been described as "pure MPC and bassline magic" that lyrically discusses the loss of one's phone and friends at a club. Lizzo freestyled each lyric to the song. “Scuse Me” contains "twinkly" opening keys before breaking into long bass drops and frantic drum sequences. The song lyrically talks about self-love, and has been compared to "Oops, Oh My" by Tweet.

"Deep" is a club-ready dance tune with soukous-inflected guitar riffs. "Good as Hell" is a "brassy" self-empowerment anthem, where the protagonist is giving more than they get in a relationship. The closing titular track is a sparse R&B song that sees the singer crooning “I thought I needed to run and find somebody to love, but all I needed was some coconut oil” against a backdrop of organs. Lyrically, it discusses the singer's journey to confidence, and was dedicated to the black women who have connected with her music. The singer plays the flute in the song, a guitar solo from producer Ricky Reed, and features excerpts of the singer's family church telling stories.

Singles
"Good as Hell" was released as the lead single from the EP on May 11, 2016 as part of the soundtrack for the 2016 film Barbershop: The Next Cut. It premiered as an exclusive on Zane Lowe's Beats 1 show.

"Phone" was released as the second single from the EP on September 19, 2016.

Other songs
The music video for "Scuse Me" was released on January 25, 2017.

Critical reception

Vanessa Okoth-Obbo, writing for Pitchfork, rated the EP 6.1 out of 10, writing that "Coconut Oil works best when considered as a statement of intent – an inventory of all the things she’s good at, and a testing ground for how best to blend them in the future." Syra Aburto, writing for Nylon, wrote that the "like the product it's named after, [Lizzo's] latest project, Coconut Oil, is essential for healthy living."

Rolling Stone placed it at number 14 on its list of the "20 Best Pop Albums of 2016".

Track listing

Personnel
Credits adapted from album’s liner notes.

 Jason Andrews – engineer (track 4)
 Elder Orlandus Dunning – additional vocals (6)
 Dubbel Dutch – co-producer (track 3)
 Chris Galland – mix engineer (track 3), mixing assistant (5)
 Chris Gehringer – mastering (all tracks)
 Lil Aaron – additional vocals (track 6)
 Lizzo – vocals (all tracks), flute (6)
 Manny Marroquin – mixing (tracks 3, 5)
 Ricky Reed – producer (all tracks), instruments and programming (1, 3, 5, 6), mixing (1), keyboards (2), additional guitar (4), executive producer
 Christian Rich – producers, instruments, and programming (track 4)
 Ike Schultz – mixing (tracks 2, 4, 6), mixing assistant (5)
 Jesse Shatkin – producer, programming, drums, bass, keyboards, and engineer (track 2)
 Ethan Shumaker – engineer (tracks 1, 3-6)

Charts

Year-end charts

References

External links
 

2016 debut EPs
Lizzo albums
Atlantic Records EPs
Albums produced by Ricky Reed
Albums produced by Christian Rich
Albums produced by Jesse Shatkin
Hip hop EPs
Contemporary R&B EPs